Solombor is a village in Kahrizak Rural District, Kahrizak District, Ray County, Tehran Province, Iran. At the 2006 census, its population was 2,643, in 636 families.

References 

Populated places in Ray County, Iran